Thruster may refer to:

Propulsion devices
A thruster is a propulsive device used by spacecraft and watercraft for station keeping, attitude control, in the reaction control system, or long-duration, low-thrust acceleration.

 Reaction engine

Spacecraft thrusters

Rocket engine, using exothermic chemical reactions of the propellant(s)
Electrohydrodynamic thruster, using ionized air (only for use in an atmosphere)
Electrostatic ion thruster, using high-voltage electrodes
Ion thruster, using beams of ions accelerated electrically
Hall-effect thruster, a type of ion thruster
Pulsed inductive thruster, a pulsed form of ion thruster
Magnetoplasmadynamic thruster, electric propulsion using the Lorentz force
Electrodeless plasma thruster, electric propulsion using ponderomotive force
Pulsed plasma thruster, using current arced across a solid propellant
Plasma thruster

Marine thrusters
Azimuth thruster, pod underneath a ship, instead of a propeller and rudder
Bow thruster, or stern thruster, at the bow or the stern of a ship or boat
Rim-driven thruster, electric motor and propeller combined in single unit
 Underwater Thrusters, electric motor or hydraulic motor and propeller combined in single unit to propel the ROV, AUV or UUV

Transportation
Thruster (surfing) is a surfboard fin design
Shkadov thruster, hypothetical megascale reaction for moving a star

Vehicles
Avio Delta Thruster, a Bulgarian ultralight trike design
Thruster T600 Sprint, a British ultralight aircraft

Others
Hurrying, also called 'coal thrusting', a 19th-century profession
Big Mother Thruster, hard rock band
Thruster (crossfit), a combination of a front squat and a push press

See also
 Thrust (disambiguation)